Bento Gonçalves may refer to:

 Bento António Gonçalves (1902–1942), member of the Portuguese Communist Party
 Bento Gonçalves da Silva (1788–1847), War of the Ragamuffins leader
 Bento Gonçalves, Rio Grande do Sul, a town in the Brazilian state of Rio Grande do Sul
 Clube Esportivo de Bento Gonçalves, a Brazilian football club

See also
Bento (disambiguation)
Bento (name)

Goncalves, Bento